George Dollond (10 June 1774 – 30 November 1852) was an English optician who constructed precision optical instruments used in astronomy, geodesy and also in navigation. Together with Peter Barlow, he also invented an afocal system to extend the focal length of telescopes, called the Barlow lens.

Biography

He was born in London, the nephew of the famous optician Peter Dollond. He was the son of John Dollond's daughter, Susan (or Susanne) (1728–1798) who married William Huggins. His father died when he was a child. When George Huggins went into partnership with Peter Dollond in 1805, he changed his name by licence to Dollond.

He was elected a Fellow of the Royal Society in December, 1819.

In 1820 Peter Dollond and George Dollond became opticians to George IV. In the same year, he was one of the founding Fellows of the Royal Astronomical Society.

He died at Camberwell Terrace North and was buried at West Norwood Cemetery.

References

 Rolf Riekher, Fernrohre und ihre Meister, Berlin 1957. (in German)
 Gloria Clifton, ‘Dollond family (per. 1750–1871)’, Oxford Dictionary of National Biography, Oxford University Press, 2004; online edn, Sept 2013  accessed 1 July 2015 [Access via public library]

1774 births
1852 deaths
Scientists from London
British opticians
19th-century British astronomers
Fellows of the Royal Society
Burials at West Norwood Cemetery
British scientific instrument makers